Paraíso de Osorio is a municipality in the La Paz department of El Salvador.

Paraiso de Osorio is a small village in the La Paz department and is the only village in El Salvador to play carambolas. Originally named El Paraiso (The Paradise), Paraiso De Osorio was established in the 19th Century. In 1883 when it officially became a town, it became known as Paraiso de Osorio, in honor of General Rafael Osorio.

Municipalities of the La Paz Department (El Salvador)